Niels Hansen Basketball Stadium is a purpose-built basketball stadium located in Kalgoorlie, Western Australia. It is the home of the Kalgoorlie-Boulder Basketball Association and the Goldfields Giants.

History
The stadium was built in 1979 and was renovated in the late 1990s. In 2018, plans were put in place for an expansion of the stadium. In 2022, a $13 million stadium redevelopment was set in motion for two new courts to be added to the existing three at the facility.

Notable games
On 23 February 2004, the stadium played host to the Perth Wildcats in an official National Basketball League regular season game against the Hunter Pirates.

The stadium also hosted an official Women's National Basketball League regular season game featuring the Perth Lynx in 2009.

References

Basketball in Western Australia
Basketball venues in Australia
Sports venues in Western Australia